Conrad is an unincorporated community in Lake Township, Newton County, in the U.S. state of Indiana.

History
Conrad was laid out as a town in 1908 by Jennie M. Conrad. A post office was established at Conrad in 1906, and remained in operation until 1915.

Geography

References

Unincorporated communities in Newton County, Indiana
Unincorporated communities in Indiana